Klaus Perwas (born 8 March 1971) is a German former basketball player and assistant coach.

Playing career
In the late 80s, Perwas was considered as a major talent as he capped for Germany's junior national teams on many occasion. His final breakthrough happened when he joined the Baskets Bonn in 1995. There, as the team's playmaker, he became a member of the German national basketball team.
Altogether, Perwas played professional basketball for the German teams SG Bramsche-Osnabrück (1992–94), SSV Ulm 1846 (1994–1995) and Telekom Baskets Bonn (1995–1999). His playing career ended prematurely after serious knee-injuries.

Coaching career
Perwas joined the coaching staff of the Telekom Baskets Bonn in 2000. Later, he also coached for the Dragons Rhoendorf and Skyliners Frankfurt.

German national team
Perwas played 12 games for the Germany national basketball team. His most notable performance was 17 points against Greece.

References

1971 births
Living people
German basketball coaches
German men's basketball players
Sportspeople from Osnabrück
Skyliners Frankfurt coaches
Telekom Baskets Bonn players